The tundra vole (Microtus oeconomus) or root vole is a medium-sized vole found in Northern and Central Europe, Asia, and northwestern North America, including Alaska and northwestern Canada. In the western part of the Netherlands, the tundra vole is a relict from the ice age and has developed into the subspecies Microtus oeconomus arenicola.

Description
The tundra vole has short ears and a short tail. Its fur is yellowish brown with paler sides and white underparts.

Habitat

The tundra vole is found in damp tundra or moist meadows, usually near water.

Behaviour and diet
This species makes runways through the surface growth in warm weather and tunnels through the snow in winter. It feeds on grasses, sedges and seeds. It is active year-round. It also digs burrows where it stores seeds and roots, especially licorice root, for the winter. The species epithet oeconomus refers to this "economical" behaviour.

Breeding
Female voles have three to six litters of three to nine young in a shallow burrow. The vole population in a given area can vary greatly from year to year.

Subspecies
Subspecies are as follows:
M. o. amakensis - Amak Island tundra vole - Alaska, United States
M. o. arenicola - Dutch tundra vole - Netherlands
M. o. elymocetes - Montague Island tundra vole - Alaska, United States
M. o. finmarchicus - Norwegian tundra vole - Norway
M. o. innuitus - St. Lawrence Island tundra vole - Alaska, United States
M. o. medius - Norwegian tundra vole - Norway
M. o. mehelyi - Central European tundra vole - Austria, Hungary and Slovakia
M. o. oeconomus - nominate subspecies - widespread
M. o. popofensis - Shumagin Islands tundra vole - Alaska, United States
M. o. punakensis - Punuk Islands tundra vole - Alaska, United States
M. o. sitkensis - Alexander Archipelago tundra vole - Alaska, United States
M. o. unalascensis - Unalaska Island tundra vole - Alaska, United States

References

Musser, G. G. and M. D. Carleton. 2005. Superfamily Muroidea. pp. 894–1531 in Mammal Species of the World a Taxonomic and Geographic Reference. D. E. Wilson and D. M. Reeder eds. Johns Hopkins University Press, Baltimore.

Tundra
Arctic land animals
Mammals of the Arctic
Rodents of Europe
Rodents of North America
Mammals described in 1776
Least concern biota of North America
Holarctic fauna